Alpout (also, Alpaut) was a village in the current territory of Agsu Rayon of Azerbaijan. Nowadays, it is in the territory of the Bijo village in the same region.

References 

Populated places in Agsu District